The Innocent Sinner is a 1917 American silent drama film directed by Raoul Walsh and starring Miriam Cooper, Charles Clary and Jack Standing.

Cast
 Miriam Cooper as Mary Ellen Ellis 
 Charles Clary as David Graham 
 Jack Standing as Walter Benton 
 Jane Novak as Jane Murray 
 Rosita Marstini as Madame De Coeur 
 William Parsons as Bull Clark 
 Johnny Reese as The Weasel 
 Jennie Lee as Mother Ellis

References

Bibliography
 Solomon, Aubrey. The Fox Film Corporation, 1915-1935: A History and Filmography. McFarland, 2011.

External links
 

1917 films
1917 drama films
1910s English-language films
American silent feature films
Silent American drama films
American black-and-white films
Films directed by Raoul Walsh
Fox Film films
1910s American films